William Digby may refer to:

 William Digby (priest) (1733–1788), British cleric
 William Digby (writer) (1849–1904), British writer
 William Digby, 5th Baron Digby (1661–1752), British peer and Member of Parliament